Fire Watch is a book of short stories by Connie Willis, first published in 1984, that touches on time travel, nuclear war, the end of the world, and cornball humour.  

The title story, "Fire Watch", is about a time-travelling historian who goes back to the Blitz in London.  He's miffed because he spent years preparing to travel with St. Paul and gets sent to St. Paul's Cathedral in London, instead. This model of time travel also features in Willis's subsequent novels Doomsday Book,  To Say Nothing of the Dog and Blackout/All Clear, set in the same continuity. 

The stories are:
"Fire Watch"
"Service for the Burial of the Dead"
"Lost and Found"
"All My Darling Daughters"
"The Father of the Bride"
"A Letter from the Clearys"
"The Sidon in the Mirror"
"And Come from Miles Around"
"Daisy, in the Sun"
"Mail Order Clone"
"Samaritan"
"Blued Moon"

This was Connie Willis's first collection.

Reception
David Pringle rated Fire Watch three stars out of four, and described Willis as a "talented new writer".

Several of the stories won or were nominated for awards:
 "Fire Watch" won both a Hugo Award for Best Novelette and a Nebula Award for Best Novelette in 1983, besides other awards
 "A Letter from the Clearys" won a Nebula Award for Best Short Story in 1983
 "The Sidon in the Mirror" was nominated for a Hugo Award for Best Novelette and a Nebula Award for Best Novelette in 1984
 "Daisy, in the Sun" was nominated for a Hugo Award for Best Short Story in 1980
 "Blued Moon" was nominated for a Hugo Award for Best Novelette in 1985.

References

External links
 A review

1984 short story collections
Science fiction short story collections
Hugo Award for Best Novelette winning works
Works by Connie Willis